Marconato is an Italian surname. Notable people with the surname include:

Denis Marconato (born 1975), Italian basketball player
Mauro Marconato (born 1996), Argentine footballer

Italian-language surnames